Vincent Defrasne (born 9 March 1977) is a former French biathlete. He won a gold medal in the 12.5 km pursuit at the 2006 Winter Olympics in Turin and a bronze medal in the 2002 Winter Olympics in Salt Lake City.

He was also a member of the winning Biathlon World Championship relay team in 2001, and the 2004 team which won bronze. At the Biathlon World Championship 2007 in Antholz, Defrasne earned a bronze medal, in the 12.5 km pursuit and a silver medal in the Mixed Relay event. In 2009 at the World Championships in Pyeongchang, Defrasne was part of the victorious mixed relay team.

Defrasne served as the flagbearer for France at the 2010 Winter Olympics.

He retired from the sport after the 2009–10 season.

Biathlon results
All results are sourced from the International Biathlon Union.

Olympic Games
3 medals (1 gold, 2 bronze)

*Mass start was added as an event in 2006.

World Championships
6 medals (2 gold, 1 silver, 3 bronze)

*During Olympic seasons competitions are only held for those events not included in the Olympic program.
**The mixed relay was added as an event in 2005.

Individual victories
3 victories (1 In, 1 Sp, 1 Pu)

*Results are from UIPMB and IBU races which include the Biathlon World Cup, Biathlon World Championships and the Winter Olympic Games.

References

External links
 

1977 births
Living people
People from Pontarlier
French male biathletes
Biathletes at the 2002 Winter Olympics
Biathletes at the 2006 Winter Olympics
Biathletes at the 2010 Winter Olympics
Olympic biathletes of France
Medalists at the 2002 Winter Olympics
Medalists at the 2006 Winter Olympics
Olympic medalists in biathlon
Olympic bronze medalists for France
Olympic gold medalists for France
Biathlon World Championships medalists
Knights of the Ordre national du Mérite
Sportspeople from Doubs